{{Infobox writer 
|birth_name = Alexandr Vladimirovich Karasyov
| image = Alexander Karasyov 2009.jpg
| caption = Alexander Karasyov – Evening at the Zoshchenko Museum
| birth_date = 1971
| birth_place = Severskaya, Krasnodar,  
| occupation = Writer
| nationality = Russian 
| alma_mater   = Kuban State University
| genre        = Short stories, poems, prose
| language     = Russian
| movement     = Russian War Prose 
| notableworks = Chechenskiye Rasskazy, Predatel| awards = *Bunin Prize (2008)  
Second O. Henry Prize "Dary Volhvov" (The Gift of the Magi) (New York, 2010)   
| period       = 21st century, Second Chechen War
| website =  
}}Alexander Karasyov''' (Russian — Александр Владимирович Карасёв, transl. Alexandr Vladimirovich Karasev) is a Russian writer living in St. Petersburg, Russia.

 Biography 

Alexander Karasyov was born in Krasnodar, Russia, in 1971. He received degrees in history and law from the Kuban State University and worked as a mechanic, engineer, teacher, and legal advisor. He served in the army, taking part in the fights in Chechnya.Огрызко, Вячеслав (Ogrysko, Vyacheslav) (2006). Кто сегодня делает литературу в России (Who does today literature in Russia). Выпуск 2. — Moscow: Literary Russia. — 496 с. — .

Since 2003 he has been published in literary journals. He was awarded the Bunin Prize (2008) and the Second O. Henry Prize "Dary Volhvov" (The Gift of the Magi) (New York, 2010). He is the author of the books "The Chechen Stories" (Chechenskye Rasskazy) and "Traitor" (Predatel').Yevgeni Popov (2009). "Who can follow Gogol's footsteps" in: Russia now , 21 April 2009  Retrieved 22 April 2013

Alexander Karasyov, like Arkady Babchenko and Zakhar Prilepin, is considered a representative of the Russian "New Realism" movement of the 21st century, continuing the tradition of the "lieutenant prose" of the 1960s and 1970s and military prose of the 1990s.

 Books 

Сhechen Stories (Russian — Чеченские рассказы, transl. Chechenskiye Rasskazy). — Moscow: Literary Russia, 2008. .
Traitor (Russian — Предатель, transl. Predatel'). — Ufa: Vagant, 2011. .Мызников, Александр (Myznikov, Alexandr) (2010). “Облик предателя”. In: Polit.ru, 12. 03. 2010.  Retrieved 15 April 2013.

In his Chechen Stories and Traitor, which are regarded as examples of modern Russian War Prose, Alexander Karasyov gives insights into life in the Russian army during the Second Chechen War. Presenting a modern war and modern warfare, the author does not rely on second hand information but on his own experience.  The short stories are often as tragicomical as the Russian army itself and show Karasyov's characters not only in the war but also in their lives outside the war in their civilian life, or their so-called "life in peace" (“мирная жизнь”).Druzhba narodov (2005). “Summary in English" in: Friendship of
Peoples (Дружба народов), 2005 (4).  Retrieved 16 April 2013.

 Literary magazines 

Alexander Karasyov's stories and essays have been published in the following Russian literary magazines: Novy mir (Новый мир), Oktyabr' (Октябрь), Friendship of Peoples (Дружба народов), Kontinent (Континент), Neva (Нева), Ural (Урал), Nash sovremennik (Наш cовремменик), Belskie prostory (Бельские просторы).Megalit (Eurasian portal of Literary Magazines). Александр Карасёв.   Retrieved 16 April 2013

 Summary in English 
Friendship of Peoples (ALEXANDER KARASEV. Chechen Stories. The author knows what he is writing about not by hearsay and his short stories are as tragicomical as the army life itself in this Russian "hot spot"). 
Novy mir (Essays: Writers about writers. “Vonnegut's Transformations" by Vladimir Berezin, "An Orthodox Rebellious" by Oleg Yermakov about Paul Bowles, "The Testament of Lieutenant Kuprin” by Alexander Karasyov and "Reider's Usurpation of Days Gone By, and Legend Founded" by Sergey Soloukh about Jaroslav Hašek.)

 Publications in anthologies  
 Современная литература народов России (Modern Literature of the Peoples of Russia) (2005).  Moscow: Pik. 
 Народ мой — большая семья: Литература наших дней. (My People — A Big Family. Literature of Our Days) (2007). Moscow: Literaturnaya Rossiya. 
 Четыре шага от войны (Four Steps from War) (2010). Sankt Saint Petersburg: Limbus Press. 
 Дары волхвов 2.0 (The Gift of the Magi) (2012). New York.

 External links 

Authorin Englishin Russian''
 Alexander Karasyov in Новая литературная карта России (New literary map of Russia).

Publications 
 Журнальный зал (Society of Russian Literary Magazines).
 Megalit (Eurasian Portal of Literary Magazines).
 Сетевая словесность (Setevaya slovesnost').
 Russian journal (Русский журнал).

Interviews (in Russian) 
 Нужна основательная встряска. (Interview with Andrej Rudalyov)
 Критик — это как в армии замполит. (Interview with Zakhar Prilepin)
 Армия дала мне самые острые эмоции. (Interview with Roman Senchin)
 От объяснительной к рассказу. (Interview with Michail Boyko)

References 

Russian writers
Russian male short story writers
1971 births
Living people